Susan Polk (born Susan Mae Bolling in 1957) is an American woman convicted in June 2006 of second degree (unpremeditated)  murder for the 2002 death of her husband, Dr. Frank "Felix" Polk. Polk's trial, described by one Associated Press correspondent as "circus-like", drew extensive media attention with its sensationalist elements.

Background

Susan Polk met Dr. Polk, a psychotherapist, in 1972 when administrators at her high school recommended she see him to treat her panic attacks. Susan Polk later made the "undisputed" claim that Dr. Polk first had sex with her when she was fourteen and still under his treatment, a taboo and a violation of professional ethics in the relationship between therapist and patient, which is now illegal in California. At the time, Dr. Polk had a wife and two children, though that couple subsequently divorced in 1982.

After graduating from high school, Polk attended Mills College and San Francisco State University Graduated magna cum laude before, in 1982, marrying Dr. Polk, who was then an instructor at the California Graduate School of Family Psychology, and an occasional consultant as well as a private practitioner. At the time of their wedding, Polk was 24 and her husband 50. During their marriage, the couple had three sons. In 2001, Susan Polk filed for divorce, a complicated and contentious proceeding during which each contacted police with allegations of domestic violence. When asked by police whether Ms. Polk had made threats or been violent, Mr. Polk said she hadn't. In 2002, while Susan was living in Montana, Dr. Polk was able to petition the courts, ex parte, without providing Ms. Polk any form of official notice in advance. The courts then granted Dr. Polk sole custody of the couple's minor son, Gabriel Polk, and sharply reduced Susan's alimony.  Dr. Polk also received sole possession of their house.

On Wednesday, October 9, Polk went to the home to retrieve her belongings and complete her dental procedure by having a permanent crown put on her tooth.  That Friday, October 11, the eldest son, Adam, came home from UCLA to pick up his dog.  On Sunday, October 13, Dr. Polk, Adam, and the youngest son Gabriel drove Adam and the dog back to UCLA.  Dr. Polk and Gabriel returned home at around 9:30 pm.  Dr. Polk, then 70, was found dead the next day, Monday, October 14, 2002.

The trial
At trial, prosecutors sought a conviction of murder in the first degree, contending that Susan Polk planned the murder of her multimillionaire husband for money. Susan Polk claimed self-defense, asserting that, after years of abuse, beginning with his "Therapy Sessions," in which Dr. Polk performed "guided visualizations" (i.e. hypnosis), he brandished a kitchen knife against her. She stated that she took control of the weapon and stabbed him instead. As an expert witness for the defense, forensic pathologist Dr. John Cooper testified that Felix Polk's death was caused by heart disease and that his stab wounds were not life-threatening and were evidence that Susan Polk delivered them in self-defense. Dr. Cooper failed to appear in court the following day to  continue being cross-examined and to present documents he claimed to have received from Susan Polk, sending a written explanation to the judge. He returned with the letters a week later to resume testimony. Prosecuting attorneys dismissed Susan Polk's claim, arguing that she had no defensive wounds from her husband's alleged attack, which was disproved by expert testimony for the defense (Dr. John Cooper).

The court was forced to declare a mistrial when the wife of Susan Polk's then-counsel, Daniel Horowitz, was murdered in an unrelated incident. Susan fired her attorneys to represent herself. She supported her defense with allegations of a history of marital and professional misconduct, including claims that Dr. Felix Polk had drugged and raped her when she was a teenager, brainwashed the couple's children, and threatened to kill her if she tried to leave him. Susan Polk repeatedly requested a second mistrial, lodging accusations of conspiracy against the prosecutor and the judge.

Each of Susan and Felix's children testified at the trial. The youngest son, Gabriel, who had found the body, testified that his mother had speculated about means of killing her husband in the weeks before his father's death. The oldest son, Adam, also testified against his mother, receiving widespread media coverage when he referred to her on the stand as "cuckoo for Cocoa Puffs". The middle son, Eli, testified on Susan's behalf, that Felix was the aggressor, controller, manipulator and responsible overall.

Jurors, obeying the judge's jury instruction order, disagreed that the crime was premeditated, finding her guilty of second degree murder. Susan Polk was sentenced to prison for a term of 16 years to life.  Her appeal was denied. Susan Polk was transferred to the California Institution for Women (CIW), a dorm-like prison, in Corona (near Chino), CA, in December 2012 and was eligible for parole in 2018. On May 29, 2019, Polk was removed from her parole hearing for being uncooperative and was subsequently denied parole. Polk will be eligible again in May 2029.

Further reading

References

1958 births
Living people
American people convicted of murder
American female murderers
American murderers
American female criminals
People convicted of murder by California
People from the San Francisco Bay Area
Mariticides
Criminals from California
21st-century American criminals